Nikos Papadopoulos (born 5 October 1971) is a Greek professional football manager and former player, who is the current manager of Greece national U21 team.

He is mostly remembered for his 9.5-year spell in OFI. He has also played for Aris, Skoda Xanthi and Apollon Kalamarias in the top tier. In the later stages of his career he played in several clubs in the lower divisions. 
As a manager, he has coached several clubs in Greece and Cyprus.

Playing career
After playing youth football, for the club of his village, Apollon Mavroneriou, he moved to nearby professional club Kilkisiakos in 1988. He moved to OFI in the winter transfer window of 1989-1990. In his first season, he was part of the squad that reached the Greek Cup final, although he did not participate in the final. He stayed in OFI for 9.5 years and even managed to become captain of the club. In 1997-1998 received a record 21-match ban for being sent-off in a match against Olympiacos. Totally he appeared in 213 matches for the club and scored 11 goals. His impact for the club was so high that in an internet polling of a local Heraklion website in 2011 Papadopoulos was voted among the all-time best XI of OFI.

After leaving OFI he moved to Aris where he stayed for 4.5 years. Totally he played 109 league matches for the club and scored 10 goals. He left Aris for Skoda Xanthi where he stayed for 1 year appearing in 17 matches and scoring 2 goals. His last club in the top tier was Apollon Kalamarias where he scored 1 goal in 16 matches. After his stint at Apollon Kalamarias he moved to the lower divisions. He subsequently moved to Ergotelis, where he appeared in 8 matches helping the club to win the Beta Ethniki. He also had spells with Agrotikos Asteras and Thermaikos and finished his playing career with Apollon Kalamarias.

Managerial career
Papadopoulos started his managerial career in 2009 for Thermaikos. He was appointed assist manager in Skoda Xanthi for the next season and after manager Georgios Paraschos was sacked, Papadopoulos was appointed caretaker manager and finished the season with the club. He moved to Cyprus for the 2011–12 to coach Olympiakos Nicosia. Midway through the season he moved to Ethnikos Achna and he was removed from his position early in the next season. After his spell in Cuprus he signed for Kavala and Panachaiki in the Greek Football League. On 20 April 2014 he was appointed manager of Iraklis. In February 2016, Papadopoulos received the best manager award of the North Group of the 2014–15 Football League by the Greek Professional Footballers Association.

Honours
OFI
Greek Cup
 Runner-up: 1989–90
Football League
Champion: 2017–18

Ergotelis
Football League 
Champion: 2005–06

References

1971 births
Living people
Greek footballers
Aris Thessaloniki F.C. players
OFI Crete F.C. players
Apollon Pontou FC players
Ergotelis F.C. players
Greek football managers
Iraklis Thessaloniki F.C. managers
OFI Crete F.C. managers
Xanthi F.C. managers
Super League Greece managers
Kavala F.C. managers
Association football defenders
Footballers from Kilkis